Moazzam Ali Khan is a Pakistani politician who has been a member of the Provincial Assembly of Sindh since October 2019. He previously served as a member from August 2018 to August 2019.

Education
studied at Aitchison College Lahore

Political career
He was elected to the Provincial Assembly of Sindh as a candidate of Grand Democratic Alliance from PS-11 (Larkana-II) in the 2018 Sindh provincial election. On 22 August 2019, the Supreme Court of Pakistan disqualified him for failing to declare his assets following a petition filed by Pakistan Peoples Party’s Nida Khuhro.

On 17 October 2019, in a by-election for PS-11 (Larkana-II), Abbasi was re-elected bagging 31,557 votes, while his rival PPP's Jameel Ahmed Soomro secured 26,021 votes.

References

Living people
Sindh MPAs 2018–2023
Grand Democratic Alliance MPAs (Sindh)
Year of birth missing (living people)